8×59mmRb Breda was an Italian heavy arms cartridge. It is unusual in that it is one of the small number of cartridges designed with a rebated rim, meaning the rim of the cartridge is smaller in diameter than the body of the cartridge. The "Rb" in the designation stands for "rebated rim".

History and Usage
8×59mmRB Breda was a caliber created for use by the Royal Italian Army in World War II. The cartridge was originally designed for use in anti-aircraft heavy machine guns like the Breda M37, Breda M38, and Fiat–Revelli Modello 1935. It was also used in the experimental Pavesi M42 semi-automatic rifle. It was introduced in 1935 but is no longer in production today.

 manufactured ammunition during the brief period the Breda machine guns were in Italian service.
 manufactured ammunition after World War Two to use in Italian machine guns they captured during World War 2.

References

 
Pistol and rifle cartridges
Military cartridges